Robert McNair Ferguson  (1829–1912) was a Scottish mathematician and a founder of the  Edinburgh Mathematical Society.

Life and work 

He was born on 8 July 1829, the son of John Ferguson, a pawnbroker, and his wife, Elisabeth Cochran.

He was educated at the Free Church Training College (Edinburgh). He studied natural philosophy in the university of Edinburgh and, after, in the university of Heidelberg where he was awarded with a PhD in 1855 tutored by Robert Bunsen. From 1858 till his retirement in 1898 he was headmaster in the Edinburgh Institute (now known as Stewart's Melville College), where he taught among others William Cunningham. He lost a leg in a school laboratory explosion in 1897.

He was founding member of the Edinburgh Mathematical Society in 1883 and was elected his president in 1885–1886.

In later life he lived at 12 Moray Place, a substantial Georgian townhouse on the fashionable Moray Estate in Edinburgh's West End.

He died on 31 December 1912. He is buried in the south-east section of Grange Cemetery in south Edinburgh.

Family

He was married to Margaret Monteith (1814-1892).

References

External links 
 

1829 births
1912 deaths
Scientists from Edinburgh
Alumni of the University of Edinburgh
19th-century Scottish mathematicians